Hoopers is an English department store chain founded in Torquay in 1982. It is now trading from four department stores and online.

Locations
 Harrogate, originally the Harrogate branch of Marshall & Snelgrove, it became Cresta House (under the ownership of Debenhams) and latterly Schofields (owned for a time by House of Fraser).
 Torquay, formerly Williams & Cox (acquired 1982)
 Tunbridge Wells, formerly Weekes (acquired 1990)
 Wilmslow, formerly Finnigans (acquired 1982)

Former locations
 Bradford, formerly Sara, a retailer of women's clothing  and accessories
 Carlisle, formerly Bulloughs (acquired 2006; closed 2013). 
 Cheltenham (opened 1987 in premises formerly occupied by Cheltenham's main Post Office; closed 2003; building now occupied by Waterstones)
 Chichester
 Colchester (formerly the Colchester branch of Keddies, acquired as a going concern in 1987)

References

External links
 Hoopers department store website

Department stores of the United Kingdom